William Stuart Prosser (1887 – 12 March 1939) was a Welsh rugby union and professional rugby league footballer who played in the 1910s.

Biography
Prosser was born in Abertillery, Monmouthshire, Wales, in 1887, the son of a coal hewer. He also worked in the mines.

At a young age, he made a name for himself playing in the fly-half position for Pontypool RFC. He played for Monmouth County on 15 occasions. He was spotted by Halifax officials and recruited to come to England in 1912. He took part in the 1914 Great Britain Lions tour of Australia and New Zealand under the captaincy of Harold Wagstaff. He played in the memorable "Rorke's Drift" Test match against Australia in which England had only 10 players for the last half-hour but won the Ashes, 14-6.

After serving during the First World War, Prosser  continued to play for Halifax until a shoulder injury ended his career after the conclusion of the 1923–24 season.

The Halifax Courier wrote of Prosser: "He was a popular player, decisive, brainy and quick in action. He frequently stated that scoring tries was not his forte, but he made many openings for others to bring points. He had a wonderful pair of hands and an instinctive sense of position."

Prosser later resided in Sowerby Bridge for many years. He died at age 47 1939 after an illness of two years. Prosser, who began his professional career for Halifax against Wakefield RFC at Thrum Hall, was buried on the same day of similar match—up in 1939.

International honours
Stuart Prosser won a cap for Great Britain (RL) while at Halifax in 1914 against Australia.

Challenge Cup Final appearances
Stuart Prosser played  in Halifax's 0-13 defeat by Leigh in the 1920–21 Challenge Cup Final during the 1920–21 season at The Cliff, Broughton on Saturday 30 April 1921, in front of a crowd of 25,000.

References

External links
!Great Britain Statistics at englandrl.co.uk (statistics currently missing due to not having appeared for both Great Britain, and England)

1887 births
1939 deaths
Date of birth missing
Great Britain national rugby league team players
Halifax R.L.F.C. players
Pontypool RFC players
Rugby league five-eighths
Rugby league players from Abertillery
Rugby union players from Abertillery
Welsh rugby league players
Welsh rugby union players